Wade Ormsby (born 31 March 1980) is an Australian professional golfer who plays on the Asian Tour. He also played in the inaugural LIV Golf Invitational Series.

Career
Ormsby was born in Adelaide, South Australia, Australia. He attended the University of Houston in the United States for three years before turning professional in 2001.

Ormsby began his career on the PGA Tour of Australasia in his home country, while also trying to play in Europe. He played his first full season on the European Tour in 2004, having earned his place via qualifying school at the end of 2003. He finished 112th on the Order of Merit in his first season to retain playing rights, and improved to 71st in 2005. He was then unable to retain his card automatically and regained it several times via return trips to qualifying school, in 2006, 2008, 2010 and 2013.  After the 2013 qualifying school, however, he was able to remain on the tour for a number of years.

In December 2006 (though on the 2007 season schedule) he finished joint runner-up in the Blue Chip New Zealand Open, which would be his highest finish in a European Tour event until 2017.

In 2008, Ormsby played on the second-tier U.S.-based Nationwide Tour, recording two top-10 finishes. His best year in his home country was 2006, when he ended sixth on the Order of Merit.

In his 264th European Tour start, Ormsby earned his maiden European Tour victory at the 2017 UBS Hong Kong Open, finishing one stroke ahead of four players.

Ormsby looked set for his first win in his home country at the 2019 ISPS Handa Vic Open, when he was two ahead of the field with two holes to play. However Ormsby made a double bogey five at the par-3 17th hole, whilst competitor David Law was eagling the final hole. This led to Ormsby missing out on victory by a single stroke, finishing in a tie for second place.

In January 2020, Ormsby won the Hong Kong Open for the second time, finishing four strokes ahead of Shane Lowry.

In March 2023, Ormsby won the International Series Thailand. He shot 20-under-par for four rounds, defeating Chonlatit Chuenboonngam in a playoff.

Professional wins (4)

European Tour wins (1)

1Co-sanctioned by the Asian Tour

Asian Tour wins (4)

1Co-sanctioned by the Professional Golf Tour of India
2Co-sanctioned by the European Tour

Asian Tour playoff record (1–0)

Playoff record
PGA Tour of Australasia playoff record (0–1)

Results in major championships
Results not in chronological order in 2020.

CUT = missed the half-way cut
NT = No tournament due to COVID-19 pandemic

Results in World Golf Championships

1Cancelled due to COVID-19 pandemic

NT = No tournament
"T" = Tied

Team appearances
Amateur
Australian Men's Interstate Teams Matches (representing South Australia): 1997

See also
2006 European Tour Qualifying School graduates
2008 European Tour Qualifying School graduates
2010 European Tour Qualifying School graduates
2013 European Tour Qualifying School graduates

References

External links

Australian male golfers
Houston Cougars men's golfers
PGA Tour of Australasia golfers
European Tour golfers
PGA Tour golfers
Asian Tour golfers
LIV Golf players
Sportspeople from Adelaide
1980 births
Living people